János Kocsis (born 16 February 1951) is a Hungarian wrestler. He competed at the 1976 Summer Olympics and the 1980 Summer Olympics.

References

External links
 

1951 births
Living people
Hungarian male sport wrestlers
Olympic wrestlers of Hungary
Wrestlers at the 1976 Summer Olympics
Wrestlers at the 1980 Summer Olympics
Martial artists from Budapest